is a former Japanese football player.

Playing career
Kawai was born in Atsugi on March 7, 1977. He joined Bellmare Hiratsuka's youth team in 1995. He played several matches in 1996 and 1997 season. In 1998, he moved to Cerezo Osaka; however, he did not play much. In 1999, he moved to the Japan Football League (JFL) club Jatco. He played as central player for five seasons. However the club was disbanded at the end of the 2003 season and he moved to the JFL club Sagawa Express Tokyo. He played many matches and he left the club at the end of the 2006 season.

Club statistics

References

External links

1977 births
Living people
Association football people from Kanagawa Prefecture
Japanese footballers
J1 League players
Japan Football League players
Shonan Bellmare players
Cerezo Osaka players
Jatco SC players
Sagawa Shiga FC players
Association football midfielders